TorqueFlite (also seen as Torqueflite) is the trademarked name of Chrysler Corporation's automatic transmissions, starting with the three-speed unit introduced late in the 1956 model year as a successor to Chrysler's two-speed PowerFlite. In the 1990s, the TorqueFlite name was dropped in favor of alphanumeric designations, although the latest Chrysler eight-speed automatic transmission has revived the name.

History
Torqueflites use torque converters and Simpson gearsets, two identical planetary gearsets sharing a common sun gear. Chrysler Corporation licensed this gearset from Simpson in 1955.

The first Torqueflites provided three speeds forward plus reverse. Gear ratios were 2.45:1 in first, 1.45 in second, and 1.00 in third. The transmission was controlled by a series of pushbuttons located on the vehicle's dashboard. The buttons were generally at the extreme driver's side end of the dash, i.e., the left in left-hand drive vehicles, and the right in right-hand drive ones. However, this was not always the case; the 1962 Dodge Phoenix, a right-hand drive export model sold in Australia and South Africa, used the U.S. 1962 Plymouth Valiant instrument cluster assembly, into the left end of which were integrated the transmission pushbuttons. Button arrangement varied by vehicle model and year; sequence was reverse, neutral, drive, second, and first, from top to bottom with vertically arrayed buttons, from left to right with horizontally arrayed buttons, and clockwise starting at upper left with clustered buttons.

A parking lock was not provided until the advent of the aluminum-case Torqueflites in 1960 (standard-duty A-904) and 1962 (heavy-duty A-727), at which point a lever was added adjacent to the pushbuttons: Moving the lever to the "park" position placed the car into neutral and engaged a lock pawl on the transmission's output shaft. Moving the park lever out of "park" position unlocked the shift buttons so that a driving range could be selected. The buttons were replaced by conventional steering column- or floor-mounted shift levers in all automatic Chrysler-built vehicles for the 1965 model year, though floor levers were available in certain sporty 1964 models.

Like a vehicle with a General Motors Hydramatic, a vehicle with a Torqueflite transmission starts out in first gear when the drive or second position is selected. This is in contrast to vehicles with several automatics from Ford and Borg-Warner, which start out in second rather than first if the second position is selected.

With 1962 came the addition of a canister-style fluid filter installed in the cooler line. For 1964, the canister filter was eliminated, and the transmission's internal intake screen was replaced by an efficient Dacron filter.

For 1966, the twin-cable shift and park control mechanism (a holdover from the push-button operation) was replaced by a solid shift control linkage consisting of a series of pushrods, rotating rods and levers. The rear pump was eliminated, which simplified and cost-reduced the transmission but rendered push-starting impossible; Chrysler engineers reasoned that improved electrical and fuel systems reduced the need to push-start vehicles, and safety concerns weighed against doing so. With the elimination of the rear pump the oil filter was designed with a single oil port. 

In 1968, part-throttle downshift functionality was added to A-904 transmissions used with six-cylinder engines. This feature permitted the transmission to shift from third to second gear in response to moderate accelerator pressure. Previously, an automatic 3-2 downshift occurred only if the driver pushed the accelerator to the floor. This change was made to maintain acceptable in-town performance with taller final-drive ratios in the rear axle — 2.76:1 rear axle gears were being furnished in applications previously equipped with 2.93:1 or 3.23:1 gearsets. Part-throttle downshift functionality was extended to V8 A-904s in 1969, and to most A-727 transmissions in 1970 to 1971.

In 1978, most Torqueflite transmissions gained a lockup torque converter clutch to mechanically connect the converter's impeller and turbine, eliminating slip for better highway fuel economy. This addition required the removal of the torque converter drain plug.

For 1980, a wide-ratio gearset was released for the A904, A998 and A999, with 2.74:1 in first, 1.54 in second, and 1.00 in third.

Torqueflite was an available option or standard equipment, depending on model and year, on all Chrysler products: Plymouth, Dodge, DeSoto, Chrysler and Imperial. It was also used by  American Motors beginning in 1972, where it was named Torque-Command, as well as by Jeep, International Harvester, Maserati Quattroporte, Monteverdi  and Bristol , as well as several brands of light and medium-duty trucks and panel vans.  When installed in Dodge trucks and vans, the transmission was marketed as LoadFlite.

In the 1990s, the transmissions were renamed, however the original Torqueflite design remained the basis of many Chrysler designed (and built) transmissions through 2007 (and FWD transaxles through 2000).

Nomenclature
Torqueflite transmissions and transaxles made through 1991 were assigned arbitrary engineering designations consisting of the letter "A" followed by three digits. 1992 and later units have four-character designations in which the first through fourth characters indicate, respectively, the number of forward speeds, torque capacity, drive type or transaxle orientation, and control system:

Rear-wheel drive transmissions

A466
The original TorqueFlite was designated A466, with a cast iron case, separate iron converter housing, and no parking pawl.

A727 (36RH/37RH)
This was initially referred to in consumer-oriented publications as the "TorqueFlite 8" to differentiate it from the A904. The A727 incorporated a parking pawl, with the sole exception of the 1962 Chrysler and Dodge 880 version, which had an extension-mounted drum brake. The heavier-duty A727 Torqueflites became — and remain — wildly popular for drag racing, off roading, and monster truck applications because of their controllability, reliability, ease/cheapness of repair and brute strength. Note there are unique bellhousing bolt patterns for the small block "A" and big block "B" engine versions of this transmission, and for the AMC/Jeep applications.

 1962-1978 361, 383, 400 B-Motor V8
 1962-1978 413, 426 Wedge, 440 RB-V8
 1966-1971 426 "Street" Hemi 
 1964-1971 426 Race Hemi (super stock, etc.)
 1962-1966 318 "A" "Poly" V8
 1968-1973 340 (all)
 1969-1983 225 (Police, Taxi)
 1971-1980 360 (4-BBl only)
 1978-1983 318 (4-bbl Police)
 1972-1978 AMC "Torque-Command"
 1984-1989 318 (2-bbl Taxi special order)
 1980-1991 Jeep (some)

Gear ratios:

A518 (46RH/46RE)
The A518, later renamed 46RH (hydraulic controlled governor pressure) and 46RE (electronic controlled governor pressure), is an A727 derivative with overdrive, in the A500 ilk.  Starting in 1990, it was used in some trucks and vans. The overdrive fourth gear ratio is 0.69:1.

Gear ratios:

Applications:
Dodge Ram pickup and vans 150/250/350 V8 and diesel engines (DGT)
Dodge Ramcharger SUV 1988-1993 5.2L & 5.9L V8
Jeep Grand Cherokee 1993 5.2L, 1998 5.9L
1995 Dodge Dakota 5.2L Magnum V8
1996 Dodge Dakota V8
1998–2003 Dodge Dakota R/T
1998-2003 Dodge Durango 5.9L V8 (4WD or 2WD)
1994-1995 Dodge Ram 2500/3500 V8
X-1995 Dodge Ram Van 2500 5.2L Magnum V8

A618 (47RH/47RE/48RE)
The A618, later renamed 47RE (electronically controlled governor pressure) is a heavier-duty version of A518 also known as the 46RE (which also has electronically controlled governor pressure, versus the earlier RH version, which was hydraulically controlled). It was used in trucks and vans starting in the mid-1990s. While currently used with some internal changes such as the move from aluminum to steel planetary carriers and an increase in the number of clutch plates when coupled to the 5.9 L Cummins Turbo-Diesel and the 8.0 L V-10 applications, it's still a 727 with overdrive and stronger internal parts. The 48RE is an electronically governed, ECU controlled, four-speed heavy-duty overdrive automatic transmission, that is stronger than its predecessor, the 47-series.

The base design from the original Torqueflite remains largely unchanged and the addition of a 2-speed output shaft (overdrive unit) that is bolted to the back of the 3-speed transmission has only two ratios: direct (1:1) and overdrive (.69:1).  While lubrication to the overdrive unit was a challenge early on, this challenge was later overcome with factory improvements and/or aftermarket valve body kits. The overdrive planetary has six pinion gears (unlike the 5 pinion used with the A518 used with the Cummins turbodiesel) which is often used as an aftermarket replacement for the stock 4 pinion planetary used with the lighter duty transmissions. 

Gear ratios:

Applications:
Dodge Ram pickups 2500/3500 ISB Diesel and iron V-10 (DGP)
Dodge Ram SRT-10 (DGP)f
1996-2002 (Also some early production 2003's) Dodge Ram 2500/3500 Diesel/V10
1994-1995 Dodge Ram 2500/3500 Diesel/V10
2003-2004 Dodge Ram 2500/3500 ISB Diesel
2003-2004 Dodge Ram 2500/3500 HO ISB Diesel
2004-2007 Dodge Ram 2500/3500 600/610 Diesel
2004-2006 Dodge Ram SRT-10

A904 (30RH)
For standard-duty applications in smaller and lighter vehicles with six-cylinder or small V8 engines starting with the 1964-1/2 273, the compact A904 (later 30RH) was introduced in 1960. This transmission used a  torque converter. There was also a smaller version of this transmission used in the Dodge Colt/Plymouth Champ cars made by Mitsubishi in Japan. This smaller transmission used a  torque converter. Note there are unique bellhousing bolt patterns for the Chrysler Slant-Six, small block V8 and AMC versions (both the six and V8s), including the obscure Chevrolet V8 bellhousing pattern when used with the Pontiac Iron Duke which was the base motor in some 1980-83 AMC and Jeep products (this bellhousing pattern is a rare find since transmission cores are usually sought after by drag racers building a Powerglide or TH200 derivative using THM2004R internals inclusive of a modified torque converter front face and/or torque converter adapter ring allowing the use of the TorqueFlite bolt pattern to a GM flexplate), and a GM 60 Degree V6 bolt pattern when used with the GM 2.8L LR2 of this transmission.

Uses:
1960-1976 170, 198, 225 slant-six
1964-1969 273 LA V8
1967-1978 318 LA V8
1972-1977 AMC Hornet
1972-1978 AMC Gremlin, AMC Matador with six-cylinder engines
1975-1980 AMC Pacer
1978-1983 AMC Concord
1979-1983 AMC Spirit
1980-1983 Jeep CJ, AMC Eagle with GM Iron Duke engine
1983-1984 Jeep DJ-5M with AMC 2.5 L
1984-1986, 1994-2000 Jeep Cherokee (XJ) with GM 2.8 L LR2 V6, AMC 2.5 L I4
1986 Jeep Comanche (MJ) with GM 2.8 L V6, AMC 2.5 L I4
1994-1995 Jeep Wrangler (YJ) with four-cylinder engine
1997-2002 Jeep Wrangler (TJ) with four-cylinder engine

A998 (31RH)
The A998, later renamed 31RH was a medium-duty, narrow or wide-ratio version of the small-frame A904 transmission for use with medium-power V8 engines and the 3.9 L V6 engine. It was equipped with four direct friction plates. This transmission differed from the A904 by having a reinforced case and internals. Narrow ratios are 2.45/1.45/1.00:1 and wide ratios are 2.74/1.55/1.00:1. 

Uses:

 1984-1989 318 (2-bbl)
 1972-1988 AMC 6 cylinder and 304 V8 engines
 1987-1988 Dodge Dakota

A999 (32RH)
The A999 (later renamed 32RH) was a heavier-duty, wide-ratio version of the small-frame A904 transmission for use with medium-power V8 engines and the 3.9 L V6 engine. It was equipped with five direct friction plates. These automatics had lower first and second gear ratios to allow the lower-powered engines to provide better acceleration without sacrificing highway fuel economy. Frequently used today in drag racing. 
 
Uses:

 1975-1980 360 (2-bbl)
 1984-1989 318 (4-bbl Police)
 1994-2003 Dodge Ram Van B150 with Magnum 3.9L V6 engine
 1994-2003 Dodge Dakota with Magnum 3.9L V6 engine
 1987-1995 Jeep Wrangler YJ with 6-cylinder engine.
 1997-2002 Jeep Wrangler TJ with 6-cylinder engine.
 Jeep Wagoneer/Grand Wagoneer  with the 258ci (4.2L) straight-6

A500 (40RH/42RH/40RE/42RE/44RE)
The A500, later renamed 40RH and 42RH (hydraulic controlled governor pressure) and 40RE, 42RE, 44RE (electronic controlled governor pressure, 1993-up), was an A904 derivative used in trucks and vans. Introduced in the 1988 model year on a limited basis, it was the first light-duty Chrysler four-speed automatic and was placed behind the 3.9 L and 5.2 L engines for light-duty purposes. Forward direct clutch drum (same as the A998) usually has a 4 friction disc pack - an A999 forward direct clutch drum with the 5 friction disc pack does interchange. A bolt in low/reverse overrun clutch assembly (shared with the A904 derivatives manufactured after 1988) uses a roller clutch which is shared with the GM THM200 and THM2004R. Much like the later production A904 with a wide ratio gear a double wrap low-reverse band is used. An extension housing mounted (New Process built) overdrive unit was bolted to the rear of the case to provide a total of four forward speeds; the extension housing and its internals interchange with the 46-48RH/RE (A518/618) - when overhauling the overdrive unit transmission rebuilders usually would use replacement parts from the A518/618 overdrive section since the A500 internals are light duty e.g. number of friction discs and thick pressure plates. 

The overdrive housing (RWD/2WD) uses an output shaft yoke commonly shared with the A727 and its later derivatives except the A618/48RE. Electronic governor pressure was phased in during the middle of the 1993 model year where it was renamed as the A500SE - Jeep Grand Cherokees equipped with the 4.0L used the A500SE/42RE since the middle of the 1993 model year replacing the AW4. Oil pans used with the A500SE/42RE is similar in design to the one used in the A500 with a clearanced area for the shift solenoid. The pan and filter were updated during the 1998 model year with some Dodge applications which has a deeper oil pan and a redesigned oil filter which is held with 2 valvebody screws (the single oil port filter does interchange with the older A500 and A904 derivatives along with the oil pan). This transmission was replaced by the 42RLE in 2004.

Gear ratios:

Applications:
1989-2001 Dodge Ram pickup 150/1500 V6/V8(2WD)
1989-2003 Dodge Ram Van B150/B250/B350 V6/V8
1989-2003 Dodge Dakota
1993-2004 Jeep Grand Cherokee I6
1996-1998 Jeep Grand Cherokee 5.2 V8
1999-2003 Jeep Grand Cherokee 3.1 TD
1998-2000 Dodge Durango 5.2L V8 (4WD (98-99) or 2WD (99-00))
1998-2000 Aston Martin Virage V8 5.3L

Front-wheel drive transaxles
The A404, A413, A470, and A670 are front wheel drive transaxle derivatives of the A904 Torqueflite.

In the late 1970s, Chrysler designed the A404 TorqueFlite three-speed automatic transaxle for its front wheel drive Dodge Omni and Plymouth Horizon subcompact cars. This transaxle would be upgraded in the 1980s into the A413 and A670 units, which were progressively heavier-duty, for Chrysler's K-cars and their derivatives, including the minivans. The four-speed Ultradrive electronic four-speed automatic transaxle would eventually replace it, but the three-speed lasted for more than a decade after the 1989 debut of the four-speed unit.

A404
The light-duty A404 was used with the smallest straight-4 engines from Chrysler, commonly the 1.7 L Volkswagen unit.

A413 or 31TH
The A404 was strengthened to become the A413 (later 31TH) in 1981. This was used with Chrysler's  2.2 and 2.5 L K-car engines. It was available both with and without a lockup torque converter.

Applications:
1995-2001 Dodge/Plymouth/Chrysler Neon
1982-1995 Chrysler LeBaron
1987-1994 Dodge Shadow/Plymouth Sundance/Chrysler 
1978-1990 Dodge Omni/Plymouth Horizon
1981-1989 Plymouth Reliant/Dodge Aries
1989-1995 Dodge Spirit/Plymouth Acclaim
1983-1988 Plymouth Caravelle
1983-1984 Chrysler E-Class
1983-1988 Dodge 600/Chrysler New Yorker
1982-1983 Dodge 400
1988-1993 Dodge Dynasty
1983-1987 Dodge Charger
1983-1986 Chrysler Executive
1984-2007 Dodge Caravan/Grand Caravan/Plymouth Voyager/Grand Voyager
1985-1989 Dodge Lancer
1989-1991 Chrysler TC by Maserati

A415
The A415 was developed for the 1.6 L Simca 1100 engine, but was not released for series production in the USA. It was used in Europe, on Talbot Simca, 1510 and Solara.

A470
The A470 was a strengthened version of the transaxle used with the 2.6 L Mitsubishi Astron engine in the K-cars from 1981 to 1985 and minivans from 1984 through 1987.

A670
The highest-specification three-speed transaxle was the A670. It was used with the 3.0 L Mitsubishi V6 engine in Chrysler's cars and minivans from 1987 to 2000.

Gear ratios:

See also
List of Chrysler transmissions
AMC/Jeep Transmissions
Pan Shapes and Naming

References

Automatic transmission tradenames
Chrysler transmissions
Chrysler
Auto parts